Alejandro Rubén Capurro (born 31 October 1980 in San Lorenzo in the Santa Fe) is an Argentine football midfielder who plays for Atlético Boxing Club.

Capurro started his career at Colón de Santa Fe in the Primera Division Argentina in 1999. He played for them until 2006 when he and his Colón teammate Franco Cángele were loaned to Turkish side Sakaryaspor in 2006.

In 2010 Capurro was bought by Gimnasia y Esgrima La Plata for a 200,000 US dollars fee.

References

External links
 Statistics at Gueardian StatsCentre
 Argentine Primera statistics  
 

People from San Lorenzo Department
1980 births
Living people
Argentine footballers
Argentine expatriate footballers
Association football midfielders
Club Atlético Colón footballers
Sakaryaspor footballers
Club de Gimnasia y Esgrima La Plata footballers
Argentinos Juniors footballers
Aldosivi footballers
CA Excursionistas players
Deportivo Maipú players
Argentine Primera División players
Primera Nacional players
Primera B Metropolitana players
Süper Lig players
Torneo Argentino A players
Torneo Argentino B players
Argentine expatriate sportspeople in Turkey
Expatriate footballers in Turkey
Sportspeople from Santa Fe Province